Henriette Parzer (born 28 August 1943) is an Austrian gymnast. She competed at the 1960 Summer Olympics and the 1964 Summer Olympics.

References

1943 births
Living people
Austrian female artistic gymnasts
Olympic gymnasts of Austria
Gymnasts at the 1960 Summer Olympics
Gymnasts at the 1964 Summer Olympics
Sportspeople from Vienna
20th-century Austrian women